The battle of Slavutych was a military engagement which took place during the Kyiv offensive of the 2022 Russian invasion of Ukraine in the city of Slavutych, a purpose-built settlement for workers in the Chernobyl Exclusion Zone. Russian forces attacked and besieged the city for nine days in March 2022, forcing out Ukrainian defenders. As in Konotop, the Russians agreed with Ukrainian authorities to not enter the city in return for residents not attacking nor opposing Russian forces.

Timeline

Initial siege and humanitarian crisis 
Russian forces surrounded Slavutych on 18 March, laying siege to the city and cutting off all supplies of food and medicine from outside the city.  The city's electricity supply was disconnected; after Ukrenergo employees repaired damaged electricity lines to reconnect the city, Russian forces damaged them again. Security checkpoints were set up on the outskirts of the city, although evacuation of civilians from the city remained impossible.

Fighting escalated in the Slavutych area on 23 March, after Russian forces opened fire on a security checkpoint in the outskirts of the city. The shelling of the outskirts of Slavutych continued into 24 March, with conditions within the besieged city described as a "humanitarian catastrophe". On 25 March, reports emerged that Russian snipers had potentially infiltrated within the city; Slavutych City Council issued a curfew as a result, forbidding residents from moving around the city.

End of battle and Russian withdrawal 
On 26 March, Russian armed forces entered Slavutych unopposed after driving Ukrainian Territorial Defense Force personnel away from the outlying checkpoints with artillery and direct tank fire. One Ukrainian fighter died at a checkpoint, and three more were killed by snipers while retreating. The city hospital was captured by Russian forces. Reports emerged that Russian troops had abducted the mayor of Slavutych, Yuriy Fomichev; he was ultimately released in time to address a protest rally against the Russian invasion which took place later that day in the city square. More than 5,000 residents of the city took part in the peaceful protest, until it was disrupted by Russian troops firing warning shots and launching stun grenades into the crowd, injuring at least one civilian. Footage of protesters fleeing stun grenades circulated online internationally; the attack on a peaceful protest rally by civilians is a possible war crime.

In an address at the protest rally, the mayor of Slavutych assured Russian forces that there were no military forces or weapons within the city, telling them that they should withdraw as a result. Subsequently, Russian forces withdrew from the city centre into the city's outer suburbs.

The mayor of Slavutych agreed to allow Russian forces to search the city for weapons in order for them to agree to withdraw from the city. This process was completed on 27 March, and Russian troops exited Slavutych. Subsequently, humanitarian corridors were established in order to allow supplies and humanitarian aid to enter the city and give civilians the opportunity to evacuate for the first time in nine days.

References 

Slavutych
March 2022 events in Ukraine
Kyiv offensive (2022)
Slavutych